Maurice "Molly" Moore was an American professional baseball player who played infield for the 1875 Brooklyn Atlantics.

References

External links

Brooklyn Atlantics players
19th-century baseball players
1881 deaths
Major League Baseball first basemen
Year of birth missing